Magali Vendeuil (1926–2009) was a French stage and film actress who also appeared in television productions. She was a member of the Comédie-Française between 1950 and 1961. She played the female lead in several films including the 1955 thriller More Whiskey for Callaghan. She was married to fellow actor Robert Lamoureux.

Selected filmography
 Drôle de noce (1952)
 Procès au Vatican (1952)
 Beauties of the Night (1952)
 More Whiskey for Callaghan (1955)
 Une fille épatante (1955)
 Jugez-les bien (1961)
 Impossible Is Not French (1974)

References

Bibliography
 Goble, Alan. The Complete Index to Literary Sources in Film. Walter de Gruyter, 1999.
 Hayward, Susan. French Costume Drama of the 1950s: Fashioning Politics in Film. Intellect Books, 2010.

External links

1926 births
2009 deaths
French stage actresses
French film actresses
French television actresses
People from Gard
20th-century French actresses
Troupe of the Comédie-Française